Oddington may refer to:
Oddington, Gloucestershire, England
Oddington, Oxfordshire, England